The 1988–89 season was Galatasaray's 85th in existence and the 31st consecutive season in the 1. Lig. This article shows statistics of the club's players in the season, and also lists all matches that the club have played in the season.

Squad statistics

Players in / out

In

Out

1. Lig

Standings

Matches

Turkish Cup
Kick-off listed in local time (EET)

3rd round

4th round

Quarter-finals

European Cup

1st round

2nd round

Quarter-finals

Semi-finals

Friendly Matches
Kick-off listed in local time (EET)

TSYD Kupası

Attendance

References

 Tuncay, Bülent (2002). Galatasaray Tarihi. Yapı Kredi Yayınları

External links
 Galatasaray Sports Club Official Website 
 Turkish Football Federation – Galatasaray A.Ş. 
 uefa.com – Galatasaray AŞ

Galatasaray S.K. (football) seasons
Galatasaray
1980s in Istanbul
Galatasaray Sports Club 1988–89 season